Adranus or Adranos was a fire god worshipped by the Sicels, an ancient population of the island of Sicily.  His worship occurred all over the island, but particularly in the town of Adranus, modern Adrano, near Mount Etna. According to Aelian, about a thousand sacred dogs were kept near his temple in this town.  

Adranus  was said to have lived under Mount Etna before being driven out by the Greek god Hephaestus, or Vulcan. According to Hesychius, Adranus was the father of the Palici, born to Adranus' lover, the nymph Thalia.

Some modern commentators have suggested that Adranus may have been related to the similarly named gods Adar and Adrammelech, from Persia and Phoenicia respectively, who were also personifications of the sun or of fire in general.

References

Sources

Fire gods
Sicilian characters in Greek mythology
Roman gods